"All Bad" is a single by Canadian singer Justin Bieber. It was released on November 11, 2013, The song is the sixth in Bieber's series Music Mondays, the first five being "Heartbreaker" (October 7, 2013), "All That Matters" (October 14), "Hold Tight" (October 21), "Recovery" (October 28) and "Bad Day" (November 4). Bieber released a new single every week for 10 weeks from October 7 to December 9, 2013. The song has been subject to controversy due to interpretations of it being a diss track towards American singer Taylor Swift.

Track listings

Charts

References

2013 singles
Justin Bieber songs
2013 songs
Songs written by Andre Harris
Songs written by Justin Bieber
Songs written by Poo Bear
Songs written by Ryan Toby